In mathematics, the Quillen–Lichtenbaum conjecture is a conjecture relating étale cohomology to algebraic K-theory introduced by , who was inspired by earlier conjectures of .  and  proved the Quillen–Lichtenbaum conjecture at the prime 2 for some number fields. Voevodsky, using some important results of Markus Rost, has proved the Bloch–Kato conjecture, which implies the Quillen–Lichtenbaum conjecture for all primes.

Statement

The conjecture in Quillen's original form states that if A is a finitely-generated algebra over the integers and l is prime, then there is a spectral sequence analogous to the Atiyah–Hirzebruch spectral sequence, starting at

  (which is understood to be 0 if q is odd)

and abutting to

for −p − q > 1 + dim A.

K-theory of the integers
Assuming the  Quillen–Lichtenbaum conjecture and the Vandiver conjecture, the K-groups of the integers, Kn(Z), are given by:

0 if n = 0 mod 8 and n > 0, Z if n = 0
Z ⊕ Z/2 if n = 1 mod 8 and n > 1, Z/2 if n = 1.
Z/ck ⊕ Z/2 if n = 2 mod 8
Z/8dk if n = 3 mod 8
0 if n = 4 mod 8
Z if n = 5 mod 8
Z/ck if n = 6 mod 8
Z/4dk if n = 7 mod 8

where ck/dk is the Bernoulli number B2k/k in lowest terms and n is 4k − 1 or 4k − 2 .

References

Algebraic K-theory
Conjectures that have been proved